The men's 66 kilograms (Half lightweight) competition at the 2002 Asian Games in Busan was held on 2 October at the Gudeok Gymnasium.

Schedule
All times are Korea Standard Time (UTC+09:00)

Results

Main bracket

Final

Top half

Bottom half

Repechage

References
2002 Asian Games Report, Page 457

External links
Official website

M66
Judo at the Asian Games Men's Half Lightweight